Mohammad Moniruzzaman (15 August 1936 – 3 September 2008) was a Bangladeshi writer, poet, professor, freedom fighter and lyricist.

Career
Moniruzzaman received his BA in 1958 and his MA in 1959 from University of Dhaka. In 1969, he got his PhD from on Hindu-Muslim relationship in modern Bengali poetry. He joined the University's Department of Bengali as a teaching advisor in 1959 and became a lecturer in 1962. He became a professor in 1975 and chair of the department in 1978. He was also district governor of the Rotary club (1986-1987) as well as a member of the Asiatic Society of Bangladesh.

Awards
 Certificate of Merit for Distinguished Contribution to Poetry by International Who's Who in poetry of London (1969)
 Bangla Academy Literary Award (1972)
 Ekushey Padak (1987)
 Alaol Padak
 Fellow of the Royal Asiatic Society of London (1969)
 Fellow of Bangla Academy (1972)

filmography
Deep Nebhe Nai (1970)
Nijere Haraye Khuji (1972)
Tejjo Putro (1998)

References

1936 births
2008 deaths
Bangladeshi lyricists
Bangladeshi male poets
Bangladeshi male musicians
Recipients of the Ekushey Padak
Recipients of Bangla Academy Award
University of Dhaka alumni
Academic staff of the University of Dhaka
People from Jessore District
20th-century male musicians